Low-g condition is a phase of aerodynamic flight where the airframe is temporarily unloaded.  The pilot—and the airframe—feel temporarily "weightless" because the aircraft is in free-fall or decelerating vertically at the top of a climb.  It may also occur during an excessively rapid entry into autorotation. This can have a disastrous effect on the aircraft, particularly in the case of helicopters, some of which need the rotor to constantly be under a non-zero amount of load.

Effects 

In smaller airplanes

Most smaller airplanes and gliders have no problems with 0g conditions. In fact, it can be enjoyable to have zero gravity in the cockpit. To produce 0g, the aircraft has to follow a ballistic flight path, which is essentially an upside down parabola.
This is the only method to simulate zero gravity for humans on earth. 

In helicopters

In contrast, low-g conditions can be disastrous for helicopters. In such a situation their rotors may flap beyond normal limits. The excessive flapping can cause the root of the blades to exceed the limit of their hinges and this condition, known as mast bumping, can cause the separation of the blades from the hub or for the mast to shear, and hence detach the whole system from the aircraft, falling from the sky. This is especially true for helicopters with teetering rotors, such as the two-bladed design seen on Robinson helicopters.
This effect was first discovered when many accidents with Bell UH-1 and AH-1 helicopters occurred. These particular helicopters simply crashed without any obvious cause. Later, it was found that these accidents usually happened during low terrain flight after passing a ridge and initiating a dive from the previous climb.
Articulated and rigid rotor systems do not lose controlling forces up to 0g, but may encounter this depending on their flapping hinge offset from the mast. However, dangerous situations, as with a teetering rotor, may not occur.

On fixed-wing aircraft

Low-g conditions can also affect fixed-wing aircraft in some instances, mainly by disrupting the airflow over the wings, making them difficult or impossible to control via the aerodynamic surfaces.

The controllability of an airplane by the control surfaces only depends on airspeed. So, if one keeps airspeed, control is retained. Usually the controllability is even increased, because there is no need to produce lift. 0g forces are a minimal problem for fixed wing aircraft, but there are exceptions, including, but not limited to, airplanes with gravity-fed fuel systems.

Use in space agencies
To simulate 0-g conditions some space agencies uses a modified passenger aircraft to simulate a low-g condition. The ESA uses an Airbus A300, for example. NASA has the Vomit Comet. One upside down parabola simulates 0g for about 25 s.

Aerodynamics
Gravity
Aviation risks
Spaceflight concepts